Katrevupadu is a village in Razole Mandal, East Godavari district in the state of Andhra Pradesh in India.

Geography 

Demographics 
 India census, Katrevupadu had a population of 4258, out of which 2159 were male and 2099 were female. The population of children below 6 years of age was 9%. The literacy rate of the village was 83%.

References 

Villages in Razole mandal